Sulcospira housei is a species of freshwater snail with an operculum, an aquatic gastropod mollusk in the family Pachychilidae.

The specific name housei is in honour of Dr. Samuel Reynolds House, who collected type specimens during the American Presbyterian Mission in Siam.

Distribution 
This species occurs in:
 Cambodia
 Laos
 Myanmar
 Thailand
 Vietnam

The type locality is "Korat, Takrong River, Siam".

References

External links 

Pachychilidae
Gastropods described in 1856